Lucrezia Aguiari (sometimes spelled Agujari) (1743/46 in Ferrara – 18 May 1783 in Parma) was an Italian coloratura soprano. She possessed an unusually agile voice with a large vocal range that spanned slightly more than three and a half octaves; faculties that enabled her to perform the most difficult passage work. In a letter dated 24 March 1770 Leopold Mozart wrote of hearing her perform a C an octave above high C at the Ducal opera of Parma, "I could not believe that she was able to reach C soprano acuto, but my ears convinced me." Aldous Huxley also mentioned this event in his novel Brave New World, (misspelt as 'Ajugari').

Biography
Born in Ferrara, during her lifetime Aguiari was often referred to as "La Bastardina" or "La Bastardella". There are several different traditions explaining the origin of this nickname, one being that she was the illegitimate child of Leopoldo Aguiari or that of his wife with the Marchese Bentivoglio. Another possible explanation was that she was an abandoned child raised by Aguiari. Another curiosity about the soprano was that she possessed a pronounced limp that was reportedly the result of a dog or hog eating part of her leg while she was an infant.

Aguiari studied with Brizio Petrucci in Ferrara and then was further educated at a convent in Florence, where she received 
singing lessons from Abbé Lambertini. In 1764 she made her professional opera debut in Florence and the following year made appearances at the opera houses in Padua, Lucca and Verona. In 1766 she appeared in Genoa, Lucca, and Parma; ultimately becoming a Court singer in the latter city in 1768. That same year, in Naples, she sang the title role at the world premiere of Paisiello's Le nozze di Peleo e Tetide, (on the occasion of the wedding ceremony of King Ferdinand IV of Naples and the Two Sicilies and Archduchess Maria Carolina of Austria). She also had several great successes in Milan, Paris, and London. There is no documentation to support reports that she was involved romantically with the composer Josef Mysliveček during her early career, in spite of many reports that appear in musicological literature.  No mention of a love affair with Mysliveček pre-dates the publication of the fifth edition of the Grove Dictionary of Music and Musicians (1954).
 
In 1780 Aguiari married the composer Giuseppe Colla (1731–1806). She left the stage after the close of the summer opera season at Genoa in 1782 due to ill health. Although it was rumoured that she was poisoned by a jealous rival, she actually died of tuberculosis in 1783 at the age of 40.

Operatic roles

Fulvia in Ezio by Tommaso Traetta (Padua, 1765)

Dircea in the pasticcio Demofoonte (Lucca, 1765)

Beroe in La Nitteti by Brizio Petrucci (Mantua, 1766)

Cleofide in the pasticcio Alessandro nell'Indie (Lucca, 1766)

Cleopatra in Tigrane by Giuseppe Colla (Parma, 1767)

Ipermestra in the anonymous Ipermestra (Parma, 1767)

Tetide in Le nozze di Peleo e Tetide by Giovanni Paisiello (Naples, 1768)

Arcinia and Bauci in Le feste d'Apollo by Christoph Willibald Gluck (Parma, 1769)

Berenice in Vologeso by Giuseppe Colla (Venice, 1770)

Andromeda in Andromeda by Giuseppe Colla (Turin, 1772)

Zama in Tamas Kouli-Kan nell'Indie by Gaetano Pugnani (Turin, 1772)

Argea in Argea by Felice Alessandri (Turin, 1773)

Erasitea in Urano ed Erasitea by Giuseppe Colla (Parma, 1773)

Cleonice in Demetrio by Josef Mysliveček (Pavia, 1773)

Andromeda in Andromeda by Giovanni Paisiello (Milan, 1774)

Cleopatra in Tolomeo by Giuesppe Colla (Milan, 1774)

Aurora in Aurora by Gaetano Pampani (Turin, 1775)

Andromeda in Andromeda by Giuseppe Colla (Florence, 1778)

Didone in the pasticcio Didone abbandonata (Florence, 1778)

Emirena in Adriano in Sira by Felice Alessandri (Venice, 1780)

Cleonice in Demetrio by Francesco Bianchi (Venice, 1780)

Cleopatra in the anonymous Tigrane (Genoa, 1782)

Source:  Claudio Sartori.  I libretti italiani a stampa dalle origini al 1800.  Cuneo, 1992–1994.

References

Musicians from Parma
Italian operatic sopranos
1740s births
1783 deaths
18th-century Italian women opera singers
Musicians from Ferrara
18th-century deaths from tuberculosis
Tuberculosis deaths in Italy
Infectious disease deaths in Emilia-Romagna